The White Horse Inn is a 1935 German musical film based on the musical comedy by Ralph Benatzky and Robert Stolz.

Cast 
 Christl Mardayn - Josepha Voglhuber, Wirtin vom Gasthof 'Zum weißen Rößl'
 Hermann Thimig - Leopold, Oberkellner
 Willi Schaeffers - Giesecke, Trikotagenfabrikant
 Annie Markart - Ottilie, seine Tochter
 Theo Lingen - Kommerzienrat Fürst
 Fritz Odemar - Dr. Siedler, Lawyer
 Marianne Stanior - Klärchen
  - Gustl, Pikkolo
 Joseph Egger
 Fritz Imhoff - Bürgermeister
 Eduard Loibner
 Karl Ehmann

References

External links 

1935 musical comedy films
1935 romantic comedy films
Austrian musical comedy films
Austrian romantic comedy films
1930s German-language films
Films directed by Karel Lamač
German films based on plays
Films based on adaptations
Films based on operettas
Operetta films
Sound film remakes of silent films
Remakes of German films
Films set in restaurants
1930s romantic musical films
Austrian black-and-white films
1935 films